Voclosporin, sold under the brand name Lupkynis, is a calcineurin inhibitor used as an immunosuppressant medication for the treatment of lupus nephritis. It is an analog of ciclosporin that has enhanced action against calcineurin and greater metabolic stability.

It was approved for medical use in the United States in January 2021, and in the European Union in September 2022. The U.S. Food and Drug Administration considers it to be a first-in-class medication.

Medical uses 
Lupus nephritis is a common form of glomerular nephritis occurring in patients with systemic lupus nephritis. Lupus nephritis commonly leads patients to chronic kidney failure and therefore places an emphasis on early intervention for improving treatment outcomes. Early intervention with voclosporin in combination with kidney response is believed to lead to more positive clinical outcomes for lupus nephritis patients. Thus, voclosporin is used in combination with background immunosuppressive regimen for the treatment of lupus nephritis. Safety has not been established in combination with cyclophosphamide.

Contraindications 
Patients who are breastfeeding or plan to breastfeed should not take this medication as it may cause fetal harm. Voclosporin is not recomnended in patients with a baseline eGFR less than or equal to 45 ml/min/1.73 m2 unless benefits exceeds risk. Dose should be reduced if the drug is used within this population as well as for patients who are hepatically impaired. Avoid the use of live attenuated vaccines when patients are on this medication. Avoid co-administration of voclosporin and other moderate to strong CYP3A4 inhibitors and if needed then reduce the dose of voclosporin. Dosages of PgP-substrate drugs should be reduced if co-administered with voclosporin.

Adverse effects 
Voclosporin has a boxed warning for malignancies and serious infections. Patients taking Voclosporin along with other immunosuppressants have an increased risk for developing malignancies and serious infections that may lead to hospitalization or death. The most common adverse reactions of voclosporin were (>3%), glomerular filtration rate decreased, hypertension, diarrhea, headache, anemia, cough, urinary tract infection, abdominal pain(upper), dyspepsia, alopecia, renal impairment, abdominal pain, mouth ulceration, fatigue. tremor, acute kidney injury, and decreased appetite.

Pharmacology 
Voclosporin is a cyclosporin A analog, similar to cyclosporin A with modifications on an amino acid within one region that allows the drug to bind to Calcineurin.  Voclosporin inhibits calcineurin, which then blocks the production of IL-2 and T-cell mediated immune responses. As a result of the calcineurin inhibition, podocytes (cells within the kidneys) are stabilized while inflammation is reduced. Reduction of inflammation within the kidneys prevents further renal damage.

Pharmacokinetics 
When administered on an empty stomach, the median Tmax of voclosporin is 1.5 hours. The AUC is estimated to be 7693 ng/mL and the Cmax  is estimated at 955 ng/mL. The volume of distribution is approximately 2,154 L and distributes within the red blood cells. The distribution between the plasma and whole blood is affected by temperature and concentration. The protein binding of voclosporin is 97%. The average terminal half-life of voclosporin is 63.6 L/h. The drug is mainly metabolized by the CYP3A4 hepatic cytochrome enzyme. Pharmacologic activity is mainly attributed to the parent molecule itself, with the major metabolite being 8-fold less potent than the parent drug.

History 
Voclosporin was discovered by Isotechnika in the 1990s. Isotechnika was founded in 1993 and merged with Aurinia Pharmaceuticals in 2013. In January 2021, Aurinia Pharmaceuticals received approval from the Food & Drug Administration to sell the drug Lupkynis.

Society and culture

Legal status 
On 21 July 2022, the Committee for Medicinal Products for Human Use (CHMP) of the European Medicines Agency (EMA) adopted a positive opinion, recommending the granting of a marketing authorization for the medicinal product Lupkynis, intended for the treatment of lupus nephritis. The applicant for this medicinal product is Otsuka Pharmaceutical Netherlands B.V. Voclosporin was approved for medical use in the European Union in September 2022.

References

External links 
 

Immunosuppressants
Peptides
Cyclic peptides
X